Thornton Curtis railway station was a temporary structure provided by the Manchester, Sheffield and Lincolnshire Railway until it opened Thornton Abbey station  to the north.

The station was situated south west of College Farm in what in 2015 was still open country with no road access. The line through the station opened on 2 April 1848, with Thornton Curtis opening "a little later". It appeared in Bradshaw from June to November 1848 inclusive. The station's permanent successor first appeared in Bradshaw in August 1849.

By 2015 the only suggestion that a station might ever have existed at the site was a slight widening of the cutting.

References

Sources

External links
 The station remains SW of College farm on an 1887 OS map National Library of Scotland
 The station and section of line railwaycodes

Disused railway stations in the Borough of North Lincolnshire
Former Great Central Railway stations
Railway stations in Great Britain opened in 1848
Railway stations in Great Britain closed in 1849